Mohammad Ilyas Mahmood  (born 19 March 1946) is a former Pakistani cricketer who played in ten Test matches between 1964 and 1969.

Cricket career
Ilyas was an opening batsman and occasional leg-spin bowler. He played first-class cricket in Pakistan from 1961 to 1972. He scored 126 in the Third Test against New Zealand in Karachi in April 1965, when Pakistan needed 202 to win in five and half hours, and reached the target with a session to spare for the loss of only two wickets. He made his highest first-class score in December 1964, when he scored 154 against South Australia.

He toured Australia a second time with the Pakistan team in 1972–73, but was injured early in the tour and omitted from the team before it left for the New Zealand leg of the tour. At the time he decided to stay in Australia to live, but he later returned to Pakistan. He served for a time as a national selector, but was dismissed in 2011 for allegedly violating the Pakistan Cricket Board's code of conduct.

Family
He is the father-in-law of Imran Farhat and Kamran Akmal. Nazar Mohammad was his uncle.

References

External links

1946 births
Living people
Pakistan Test cricketers
Pakistani cricketers
Lahore cricketers
Pakistan International Airlines cricketers
Lahore A cricketers
Lahore Greens cricketers
Pakistan International Airlines A cricketers
South Zone (Pakistan) cricketers
Central Zone (Pakistan) cricketers
Cricketers from Lahore